Emiliano Zapata is a town and one of the 84 municipalities of Hidalgo, in central-eastern Mexico. The municipality covers an area of 36 km².

As of 2005, the municipality had a total population of 12,309.

References

Municipalities of Hidalgo (state)
Populated places in Hidalgo (state)